The Shreveport Open was a golf tournament on the Buy.com Tour from 1991 to 2002. It was played at the Southern Trace Country Club in Shreveport, Louisiana. In its last year, it was sponsored by Hibernia National Bank and called the Hibernia Southern Open.

The purse in 2002 was $425,000, with $76,500 going to the winner.

Winners

Notes

References

Former Korn Ferry Tour events
Golf in Louisiana
Sports in Shreveport, Louisiana
Recurring sporting events established in 1991
Recurring sporting events disestablished in 2002
1991 establishments in Louisiana
2002 disestablishments in Louisiana